Ernst Toller (1 December 1893 – 22 May 1939) was a German author, playwright, left-wing politician and revolutionary, known for his Expressionist plays. He served in 1919 for six days as President of the short-lived Bavarian Soviet Republic, after which he became the head of its army. He was imprisoned for five years for his part in the armed resistance by the Bavarian Soviet Republic to the central government in Berlin. While in prison Toller wrote several plays that gained him international renown. They were performed in London and New York City as well as in Berlin.

In 1933 Toller was exiled from Germany after the Nazis came to power. He did a lecture tour in 1936–1937 in the United States and Canada, settling in California for a while before going to New York. He joined other exiles there. He died by suicide in May 1939.

In 2000, several of his plays were published in an English translation. The most recent comprehensive biography of Toller is by Robert Ellis, "Ernst Toller and German Society. Intellectuals as Leaders and Critics" Fairleigh Dickison University Press, 2013.

Life and career 
Toller was born in 1893 into a Jewish family in Samotschin, Germany (now Szamocin, Poland). He was the son of Ida (Kohn) and Max Toller, a pharmacist. His parents ran a general store.

At the outbreak of World War I, he volunteered for the German Army. After serving for 13 months on the Western Front, he suffered a complete physical and psychological collapse. His first drama, Transformation (Die Wandlung, 1919), was wrought from his wartime experiences.

Together with leading anarchists, such as B. Traven and Gustav Landauer, and Toller's party, the Independent Social Democratic Party of Germany (USPD), Toller was involved in the short-lived 1919 Bavarian Soviet Republic. The communists were against the founding of a communist republic at this point. He served as president from 6 April to 12 April. Communists agitated against Toller and his councils and sent speakers into soldiers barracks to announce that the Council Republic did not deserve to be defended. He issued numerous decrees, the press was socialised, the mining industry was socialised, and the eight-hour working day made legally binding. He decreed that citizens could withdraw only 100 marks per day from the banks, and issued reassurance to the workers that these measures were directed against the major capitalists who were attempting to take money abroad. A decree was made against exorbitant rents.  His government members were not always well-chosen. For instance, the Foreign Affairs Deputy Dr. Franz Lipp (who had been admitted several times to psychiatric hospitals) informed Vladimir Lenin via cable that the ousted former Minister-President, Johannes Hoffmann, had fled to Bamberg and taken the key to the ministry toilet with him.  On April 13, 1919 the Communist Party seized power, with Eugen Leviné as their leader. In May 1919, the republic was defeated by the Freikorps. 

The noted authors Max Weber and Thomas Mann testified on Toller's behalf when he was tried for his part in the revolution. He was sentenced to five years in prison and served his sentence in the prisons of Stadelheim, Neuburg, Eichstätt. From February 1920 until his release, he was in the fortress of Niederschönenfeld, where he spent 149 days in solitary confinement and 24 days on hunger strike.

Toller was unable to see the plays he had written in prison performed until after his release in July 1925. The most famous of his later dramas, Hoppla, We're Alive! (Hoppla, wir Leben!), directed by Erwin Piscator, premiered in Berlin in 1925. It tells of a  revolutionary discharged from a mental hospital after eight years, who discovers that his former comrades have grown complacent and compromised within the system they once opposed. In despair, he kills himself.

Exile, death and legacy 

Two of his early plays were produced in New York in the 1930s: The Machine Wreckers (1922), whose opening night in 1937 he attended, and No More Peace, produced in 1937 by the Federal Theatre Project and presented in New York City in 1938. Their sense of immediacy was gone: the first play was related to the First World War and its aftermath, and the second an earlier period of the rise of the Nazis. Their style was outmoded for New York, and the poor reception added to Toller's discouragement.

Suffering from depression, separated from his wife and struggling with financial woes (he had given all his money to Spanish Civil War refugees), Toller committed suicide on 22 May 1939. He hanged himself in his room at the Mayflower Hotel, after laying out on his hotel desk "photos of Spanish children who had been killed by fascist bombs".

The English author Robert Payne, who knew Toller in Spain and in Paris, later wrote in his diary that Toller had said shortly before his death: "If ever you read that I committed suicide, I beg you not to believe it."  Payne continued: "He hanged himself with the silk cord of his nightgown in a hotel in New York two years ago. This is what the newspapers said at the time, but I continue to believe that he was murdered".

W. H. Auden's poem "In Memory of Ernst Toller" was published in Another Time (1940).

Works 

 Transfiguration (Die Wandlung) (1919)
 Masses Man (Masse Mensch) (1921)
 The Machine Wreckers (Die Maschinenstürmer) (1922)
 Hinkemann (org. Der deutsche Hinkemann), Uraufführung (19 September 1923) Produced under titles of The Red Laugh and Bloody Laughter (US).  Issued in England by the Nonesuch Press in 1926 under the title Brokenbrow with a translation by Vera Mendel.
 Hoppla, We're Alive! (Hoppla, wir leben!) (1927)
 Feuer aus den Kesseln (1930)
 Mary Baker Eddy (1930), play in five acts, with Hermann Kesten

After exile:
 Eine Jugend in Deutschland (A Youth in Germany) (1933), autobiography, Amsterdam
 I Was a German: The Autobiography of a Revolutionary (1934), New York: Paragon
 Nie Wieder Friede! (No More Peace) (1935) First published and produced in English, as he was living in London, but it was written originally in German.
 Briefe aus dem Gefängnis (1935) (Letters from Prison), Amsterdam
 Letters from Prison: Including Poems and a New Version of 'The Swallow Book' (1936), London

In 2000, Alan Pearlman published his translation into English of several of Toller's plays. The literary rights to the works of Ernst Toller were the property of the novelist Katharine Weber until the copyright expired on 31 December 2009. His works have now entered the public domain.

Influence
The English dramatist Torben Betts has reworked Hinkemann; his play Broken was produced in the UK in 2011.
Toller was a central character in the Miles Franklin Award-winning novel All That I Am by Anna Funder.
Paul Schrader's 2017 film First Reformed centers on a troubled, although Protestant, character named for Toller.
A poem of Miklos Radnoti (Radnóti Miklós) Hungarian poet, writer and translator was published as "Thursday" (Hungarian title: Csütörtök) on 26 May 1939.

References

Sources

Further reading 

 (Ebook)
  (Ernst Toller Society)
 Henry Toller Collectionat the Harry Ransom Center

 
  (Online version of Eine Jugend in Deutschland)
 Ernst Toller Universitätsbibliothek der FU Berlin (archived link containing many links to other sites and works about Toller)
 
 

1893 births
1939 suicides
People from Szamocin
People from the Province of Posen
German Jewish military personnel of World War I
Independent Social Democratic Party politicians
Jewish writers
Jewish German politicians
Jewish presidents
Jewish socialists
Bavarian Soviet Republic
German expressionist dramatists and playwrights
Modernist theatre

Suicides by hanging in New York City
People of the German Revolution of 1918–1919
Jewish emigrants from Nazi Germany to the United States
German male dramatists and playwrights
20th-century German dramatists and playwrights
1939 deaths
German revolutionaries
Suicides by Jews during the Holocaust